The Bede BD-12 was an American homebuilt aircraft designed by Jim Bede and produced by Bede Aircraft of Medina, Ohio, introduced in the 1990s. The aircraft was intended to be supplied as a kit for amateur construction, but only one was ever built. It first flew in 1995.

Design and development
Designed as a scaled-up Bede BD-5, the BD-12 featured a cantilever low-wing, a two-seats-in-side-by-side configuration enclosed cockpit under a gull-wing canopy, retractable tricycle landing gear and a single engine in pusher configuration.

The aircraft was made from fibre-reinforced plastic composite materials. The standard engines used were the  Continental O-200A or the  Lycoming O-320 powerplant.

The company that currently owns the rights to the design, BedeCorp, indicates that production was not started due to the cost of tooling and the lack of funds.

The design was further developed into the Bede BD-14, a four-seat version.

Operational history
In April 2015 no examples were registered in the United States with the Federal Aviation Administration, although one had been registered to the designer at one time.

Variants
BD-12B
Version with  Continental O-200A engine.
BD-12C
Version with  Lycoming O-320 engine.

Specifications (BD-12)

References

External links

BD-12
1990s United States sport aircraft
1990s United States civil utility aircraft
Single-engined pusher aircraft
Low-wing aircraft
Homebuilt aircraft
Aircraft first flown in 1995